Delphin (dolphin) was a midget submarine created during World War II. Designed in 1944, only three prototypes were created by Nazi Germany's Kriegsmarine by the end of the war, all of which were destroyed. The Delphin was built for underwater speed attacks, as German engineers under the leadership of Ulrich Gabler discovered that past midget submarines were too slow to match the speeds of large ships in the English Channel.

During trials, the submarine reached a speed of seventeen knots while submerged. On 19 January 1945, the first prototype was destroyed after a collision with a boat and resulted in further testing being abandoned. Two other prototypes under construction in Berlin were moved to Pötenitz near Trave, where they were blown up as Allied forces approached.

References

Bibliography

Sieche, Erwin F.

External links
Information on the Delphin class and its operations on Uboat.net 

Midget submarines
World War II submarines of Germany